The Game is the fourth studio album by American singer Chico DeBarge. It was released by Motown Records on October 26, 1999 in the United States. The album marked DeBarge's return to Motown Records since 1988 after Kedar Entertainment founder Kedar Massenburg was appointed as head of the label in late 1998. The Game peaked at number 41 on the US Billboard 200 and number 6 on the Top R&B/Hip-Hop Albums chart.

Critical reception

AllMusic editor Jon Azpiri rated the album two and a half stars out of five. He found that "many of the tracks on The Game feel deeply autobiographical [...] Tracks like the self-explanatory "Sexual" are filled with the kind of growls and yelps of joy that you'd hear on a Marvin Gaye record. While Debarge falls well short of a master like Gaye, he is well on his way to becoming a distinct artist, a welcome relief from much of late-'90s R&B which seems to come off an assembly line."

Track listing

Notes
"Heart Mind & Soul" is a cover of the title track of the 1994 album from DeBarge's brother El DeBarge.

Personnel 
Credits adapted from the liner notes of The Game.

Doug E. Fresh – beatbox on "Listen to Your Man"
Andrea Martin – background vocals on "Sorry"
Benjamin Wright – string arrangement on "Everybody Knew But Me" and "Heart, Mind & Soul"
DJ Quik – mixing on "Till Tomorrow"

Brian McKnight – background vocals on "When Can I See You Again"
Mama DeBarge – additional vocals on "Heart, Mind & Soul"
Wah Wah Watson – guitar on "Heart, Mind & Soul"

Charts

Release history

References

Chico DeBarge albums
1999 albums
Motown albums